International Transportation Service (ITS) is an American container terminal company that deals with the receipt and shipment of containerized cargo in domestic and foreign trade. It also focuses on marine cargo handling, vessel stevedoring, on-dock rail, and staffing services. ITS was founded and owned by K Line until 2020. International Transportation Service serves worldwide.

ITS was founded in 1971 and is located at the Port of Long Beach in Long Beach, California.  The Green Port Policy was adopted by ITS in 2006 to reduce pollution in Long Beach and Los Angeles.

ITS clients have included COSCO Container Lines, Hamburg Sud, Hanjin Shipping, Kawasaki Kisen Kaisha, Ltd., Maersk Line, U.S. Lines and Yang Ming Marine Transport Corporation.

See also
Port of Long Beach
Port of Los Angeles
Terminal Island

References

External links

Companies based in Long Beach, California
Container shipping companies of the United States
Shipping companies of Japan
Shipping companies of the United States
Transport companies established in 1971
1971 establishments in California
2020 disestablishments in California
Container shipping companies